Aba al-Waqf  ) is a village in the markaz of Maghagha in Minya Governorate, Egypt. It is about 6 miles (10km) south of Maghagha, and 2 miles (3km) west of the Nile.

Etymology 
The name of the village comes from Egyptian jp.t "harem". The Coptic and the Greek name of Luxor also share the same etymology.

History 
In the late 1800s, Aba al-Waqf was the site of one of the largest sugar mills in the world. The mill, which belonged to the Khedive, was constructed beginning in 1872 on the banks of the Ibrahimiya Canal.

The 1885 Census of Egypt recorded Aba al-Waqf (as Aba-el-Wakf in the district of Beni Mazar in Minya Governorate; at that time, the population of the city was 4,546 (2,293 men and 2,253 women).

References 

Populated places in Minya Governorate